Solid perfumes or cream perfumes are perfumes in solid state rather than the liquid mix of alcohol (ethanol) and water used in eau de parfum, eau de toilette, eau de cologne, etc.  Normally the substance that gives the cream its base comes from a type of wax that is initially melted. Once melted, a scent or several scents may be added.  

Solid perfume is used either by rubbing a finger or dipping a cotton swab against it and then onto the skin. Sometimes solid perfume can take more time for the deeper notes to come out than a spray perfume.

The latest solid perfumes are designed as handbag aromas, so a compact way of making perfume more portable.

Historically, ointment-like unguents have been used as a type of solid perfume since Egyptian times.

See also
 Head cone

References

Further reading
 Mandy Aftel, Scents & Sensibilities: Creating Solid Perfumes for Well-Being, Gibbs Smith, 2005, 

Perfumery
Perfumes